Charlotte Chapel may be
Charlotte Chapel (Edinburgh)
Charlotte Chapel, London, which later became the Westminster Theatre.